is a Japanese professional footballer .

Club career
Nakano started his career with FC Tokyo while studying at the Waseda University. He moved to Germany in 2011 to join 6th division side Pommern Greifswald.  He was loaned to Ekstraklasa side Arka Gdynia in 2012, but left less than five months later, without a first team appearance.

He moved to Latvia in 2013, joining Latvian First League side BFC Daugavpils. In his first season, Nakano managed a 1:1 goal ratio, scoring 26 goals in 26 games as his team were promoted to the Latvian Higher League.  He earned a transfer to fellow Latvian side FK Jelgava in January 2016, and was included in the 2016 Latvian Higher League team of the season.

Despite his good performances, Nakano struggled with the freezing weather in Latvia, as temperatures dipped to −25° in the winter. He was offered a move to Thai League side Chonburi F.C. in 2017, an opportunity which he took.

International career
Nakano has represented Japan at numerous youth levels, and was called up to represent a Japan XI against the Nepal national football team in 2016.

Career statistics

Club

Notes

Honours

Club
FK Jelgava
Latvian Cup: 2015–16

References

External links
 Profile at UEFA

1988 births
Living people
Association football midfielders
Japanese footballers
Japanese expatriate footballers
Association football people from Tokyo Metropolis
People from Koganei, Tokyo
FC Tokyo players
Arka Gdynia players
BFC Daugavpils players
FK Jelgava players
Ryotaro Nakano
Ekstraklasa players
Latvian Higher League players
Ryotaro Nakano
Expatriate footballers in Germany
Expatriate footballers in Poland
Expatriate footballers in Latvia
Expatriate footballers in Thailand
Greifswalder SV 04 players